Interviewing Monsters and Bigfoot is a 2020 American comedy film written and directed by Thomas Smugala and starring Tom Green and Les Stroud.

Plot
Cory Mathis, a respected college professor, claims a mythical forest creature killed his wife transforming him into a man haunted by obsession and revenge. He partners up with legendary Big Foot hunter Fran Andersen  who is out to collect the Nat Geo 10 million dollar bounty for capture of the creature. Unfortunately, by-the-book forest ranger, Billy Teal, a covert government agency and a serial hoaxer have other plans.

Cast
Tom Green as Billy Teal
Les Stroud as Cory Mathis
Tera Eckerle
Quinn Strong
Brian Kowalski
Elise Edwards
Stacy Brown Jr.
A.J. Koehler
Rick Dyer
Jessi Combs

Release
The film was released on VOD on October 6, 2020.  It will be released on DVD on April 20, 2021.

Reception
Brian Shaer of Film Threat gave the film a 6.5 out of 10.

References

External links
 
 

American comedy films
2020s English-language films
2020s American films